Co-op Academy Manchester, formerly known as The Co-operative Academy of Manchester is a non-selective, mixed secondary school in Blackley, Manchester. It opened in September 2010 and replaced Plant Hill Arts College.

The academy is part of The Co-operative Academies Trust - a group of schools sponsored by The Co-operative Group. The values of the academy are Fairness, Ambition and Respect.

The school has a business-focused ethos, backed up by the support of its lead sponsor and features of the new building such as the open-plan flexible learning zones and the boardroom. The academy's first Principal, Kathy Leaver, was appointed to transform the former Plant Hill school following her dramatic success as head of Sale High School.

In July 2011 students from the Academy took part in the chorus of Victoria Wood's "That Day We Sang", part of the Manchester International Festival.

In 2013 the Manchester Evening News recognised the effort of the retiring Principal Kathy Leaver, her team and parents in transforming the academy, whose results were the most improved in the city. The paper also recognised the academy's achievement in 2014 of the highest attendance rate of the city's state schools.

Stephen Brice took up the position of Principal in April 2014.

In late 2015, the academy opened The Hive - a business and enterprise centre. The Hive, which was formerly an unused Adult Education Centre contains a number of office pods available for small businesses or start-ups to rent. In addition, The Hive is also used by Yes Manchester who help local residents into work or training.

In 2018, a new £18 million extension opened, which increased the capacity of the academy and created new facilities.

In 2020, Principal Stephen Brice was appointed as Executive Headteacher for Greater Manchester, working across a number of schools in the Trust. Christopher Beard took up the role of Headteacher. Before taking on his new role, Brice created a Minecraft version of the academy to help people familiarise themselves with the building during the COVID-19 pandemic in the United Kingdom.

Facilities
The academy's facilities includes areas for each learning zone, specialist sports, art, IT, technology, music and science facilities. The 2018 extension includes a 229-seat theatre, a climbing wall and several new teaching areas.

The school acts as a hub for the local community, and hosts the 105th Manchester St Peters Scout Group, One Education Music Service and the Blackley Volunteer Police Cadets.

Controversy

School security guard suspended after video shows boy, 14, being knocked to the ground

A school security guard was suspended after video footage emerged of a teenage student appearing to be violently pushed to the floor.

School girl, 11, taken to hospital following a stabbing before school

12-year-old girl was arrested on suspicion of assault following the incident on Chapel Lane near the Co-op Academy in Blackley.

Canteen is so busy pupils have no time to eat dinner

Pupils at a north Manchester high school are missing dinner because the canteen is so busy, parents claim.

Gang of gunmen ambush pupils on their way home

Police required to protect children as they leave a Manchester school after five pupils were robbed at gunpoint.

Pupil handed in a knife to her teacher - expelled?

Pupil informed her class teacher about the knife immediately, asked her to go to the head of year. now she could be expelled?

See also
 List of schools in Manchester

References

Academies in Manchester
Secondary schools in Manchester
2010 establishments in England
Educational institutions established in 2010